A Letter from Death Row may refer to:

A Letter from Death Row (film), a 1998 psychological thriller film
A Letter from Death Row (album), the 1998 soundtrack by Bret Michaels to the film of the same name